Centaurium littorale, the seaside centaury, is a species of flowering plant belonging to the family Gentianaceae.

Its native range is Western and Northern Europe to Northern Russia.

References

littorale